"Lazarus" is a song by English rock musician David Bowie. Released on 17 December 2015 as a digital download, it was the second single from his twenty-sixth and final studio album, Blackstar (2016). It is Bowie's last single to be released during his lifetime. The single received its world premiere on BBC Radio 6 Music's Steve Lamacq on the day of its release as a single. In addition to its release on Blackstar, the track is used in Bowie's off-Broadway musical of the same name. The official music video, directed by Johan Renck, was released on 7 January 2016, three days before Bowie's death.

Bowie never performed the song live, but on 17 December 2015, Michael C. Hall appeared on The Late Show with Stephen Colbert, singing "Lazarus" to promote both the single's release and the musical running at New York Theatre Workshop starring Hall.

"Lazarus" was Bowie's first top 40 hit single on the Billboard Hot 100 in more than 28 years, landing at number 40 in the week after his death.

Billboard ranked "Lazarus" at number 40 on their "100 Best Pop Songs of 2016" list. Pitchfork listed "Lazarus" on their ranking of the 100 best songs of 2016 at number 5. In the annual The Village Voices Pazz & Jop mass critics poll of the year's best in music in 2016, "Lazarus" was ranked at number 8.

Lyrics and meaning
"Lazarus" is a swan song. According to Bowie's producer Tony Visconti, the lyrics and video of "Lazarus" and other songs on the album were intended to be a self-epitaph, a commentary on Bowie's own impending death. The song's reference to Lazarus has been interpreted as referring to Bowie's prediction of increased fame following his death.

Music video

The official music video for "Lazarus", featuring a shorter edit of the song lasting just over four minutes, was uploaded on 7 January 2016 to Bowie's Vevo channel on YouTube. The video was directed by Johan Renck (who also directed the music video for Bowie's previous single, "Blackstar") in November 2015; during the week of shooting, doctors reportedly informed Bowie the cancer was terminal and that they were ending treatment. The filming location was a studio in the New York City borough of Brooklyn. The video is shown in a 1:1 aspect ratio and prominently features Bowie, appearing with a bandage and buttons sewn over his eyes, lying on a deathbed. A director's cut exists restoring the original widescreen aspect.

The video finishes with Bowie retreating into a dark wardrobe. In the scenes featuring the wardrobe, Bowie is wearing a diagonally striped suit as seen on the back cover of the 1991 CD reissue of the Station to Station album, where he is pictured sitting on the floor drawing the kabbalistic Tree of Life. The Tree of Life is also referenced in the Station to Station lyrics, a "magical movement from Kether to Malkuth".

The video was nominated for three awards: Best Direction, Best Cinematography and Best Editing, at the 2016 MTV Video Music Awards.

Track listing

Personnel
Personnel adapted from Blackstar liner notes.

Musicians
 David Bowie – vocals, guitar, mixing, production
 Tim Lefebvre – bass
 Mark Guiliana – drums
 Donny McCaslin – saxophone
 Ben Monder – guitar
 Jason Lindner – wurlitzer organ, keyboards

Technical personnel
 Tony Visconti – production, engineering, mixing engineer
 Joe LaPorta – mastering engineer
 Kevin Killen – engineering
 Erin Tonkon – assistant engineer
 Joe Visciano – assistant engineer
 Kabir Hermon – assistant engineer
 Tom Elmhirst – mixing engineer

Charts

Weekly

Year-end

Release history

See also
Lazarus of Bethany
Rich man and Lazarus

References

Sources

2015 singles
2015 songs
Columbia Records singles
David Bowie songs
Gothic rock songs
Music videos directed by Johan Renck
Song recordings produced by David Bowie
Song recordings produced by Tony Visconti
Songs about death
Songs written by David Bowie